April Dawn Lacy (nicknamed as "Brush Girl") was a previously unidentified American homicide victim who was discovered in 1996 in Decatur, Texas. She was identified in 1998 after her face was reconstructed and dental information was compared between both subjects. Although her body was identified, her murder remains unsolved. The circumstances surrounding April's murder are unknown, although she is believed by police to have run away from home and may have engaged in prostitution.

Circumstances
April was born in Oklahoma City, Oklahoma, on July 2, 1982. She grew up in a poor family who used both drugs and alcohol and was often estranged from them, as she frequently stayed at a friend's house.

April had a dysfunctional relationship with her parents, who allowed her to use substances such as cigarettes at a young age. The family reportedly lived in cheap hotels and rummaged through garbage for aluminum cans and other items to provide money for food and drugs. It is also believed that her mother, Jacqueline, had coerced April into prostitution and shoplifting to provide for her cocaine addiction, although she claims her daughter was not involved with sex trafficking. When she failed to succeed with these tasks, April claimed that she was physically abused. 

April ran away from home after an argument with her mother, who refused to converse with her daughter about an unknown reason, presumably due to conflict between her parents. Her mother Jacqueline reported her missing on October 3, 1996, which she claimed was the day the argument took place. Her father, Dale, also reported her missing three months later.

Some members of the police force have stated that her mother may be more knowledgeable about the murder than she has provided, as there is strong evidence that Jacqueline had served as a pimp for her daughter. By the state of April's remains, it is also believed that she had been missing for longer than reported, as it appeared that she had died at least a week before, instead of five days.

Discovery
On October 8, 1996 a farmer discovered a young woman's nude body in a pile of dead branches outside Decatur, Texas. When police officers came to the scene, it was presumed that she had been strangled and then dragged, by the arm, to the pile of brush, judging by the position of her body. Her body had decomposed to a point where she was not in a recognizable state, which often causes problems with body identification. Investigators noted that the victim had dyed her hair blond, bit her nails, and was between 5'4" and 5'5" tall at a weight of 110 to 130 pounds. She also lacked any visible identifying features, such as scars or tattoos. A forensic dentist examined her teeth and concluded she was around 14 when she was murdered, although initial reports stated she was between 20 and 40.

Investigation
Because the girl remained unidentified for some time, the officer investigating the case dubbed her as "Brush Girl." Authorities attempted to identify her body by using her physical description to match to missing persons, who were ruled out of the case. Because her body was found near the border between Texas and Oklahoma, it was presumed she may have been native to Oklahoma City or possibly Dallas, Texas.

April's face was reconstructed by forensic artist Karen T. Taylor to aid in her future identification. Authorities interviewed April's parents about the circumstances of her disappearance and showed them the sketch of the unidentified girl, which bore a strong resemblance. The Lacy family was reportedly in denial about the possibility that their daughter was murdered, as they "wanted more proof" than a match of dental records, which was made after the teeth of the victim and X-rays taken of April's teeth were compared. Additionally, comparison of sinus passages also matched between the subjects, but did not convince her family. DNA was eventually compared and matched.

It is believed that April Lacy was murdered by a serial killer who had preyed on prostitutes in the same area. There was also a possibility that she was a victim of the Redhead murders, although her murder took place over a decade after the spree began. Authorities have also traced leads across Oklahoma with no results.

See also

Cold case
Crime in Texas
Forensic facial reconstruction
List of solved missing person cases
List of unsolved murders
National Center for Missing and Exploited Children
The Doe Network
Unidentified decedent

References

Cited works and further reading

External links
 April Dawn Lacy at Find a Grave
 Contemporary news article pertaining to the murder of April Lacy

1996 in Texas
1996 murders in the United States
October 1996 events in the United States
October 1996 crimes
Deaths by person in Texas
Deaths by strangulation in the United States
Formerly missing people
Missing person cases in Oklahoma
Unsolved murders in the United States
Violence against women in the United States
Female murder victims
Murdered American children
Incidents of violence against girls
Wise County, Texas
People murdered in Texas